George Summers may refer to:
George Summers (cricketer) (1844–1870), English cricketer who played for Nottinghamshire
George W. Summers (1804–1868), American politician, attorney and jurist from Virginia
George Summers (cyclist), British Olympic cyclist
George Summers (footballer) (born 1941), Scottish football forward, manager and coach
George Summers (racer) in New England Auto Racers Hall of Fame

See also
George Somers (disambiguation)